The Social Democratic Party of Switzerland (SP) or Swiss Socialist Party (PS), is a political party in Switzerland. The SP has had two representatives on the Federal Council since 1960 and received the second highest total number of votes in the 2019 Swiss federal election.

The SP was founded on 21 October 1888 and is currently the second largest of the four leading coalition political parties in Switzerland. It is the only left-leaning party with representatives on the Federal Council, currently Alain Berset and Élisabeth Baume-Schneider. As of September 2019, the SP is the second largest political party in the Federal Assembly.

Unlike most other Swiss parties, the SP is the largest pro-European party in Switzerland and supports Swiss membership of the European Union. Additionally, it is strongly opposed to capitalism and maintains a long-term goal of "overcoming capitalism". The party is a member of the Progressive Alliance and an associate member of the Party of European Socialists.

History 

Before the establishment of the national SP, there were various 19th-century labour movements in Switzerland such as the Grütli Union, the Swiss Federation of Trade Unions and several local social-democratic parties. Most of these labour parties only lasted a short time, until the foundation of the Social Democratic Party on 21 October 1888 (the Swiss Labour Day). Albert Steck of Bern composed the party's platform which emphasised democracy, rejected revolutionary aspirations and mandated a democratic solution to the social question. The first party president was Alexander Reichel of Bern.

Two years after the party's foundation, Jakob Vogelsanger was the first Social Democrat to be elected to the National Council. In 1904, the moderate party platform was replaced at a party conference in Aarau with a Marxist program written by Otto Lang. The first-past-the-post voting system for elections to the National Council and the borders of the electorates initially prevented the party from achieving serious political power on the national level, despite growing numbers of supporters. Two popular initiatives for the introduction of a proportional voting system were rejected.

The party's historical archives are hosted today by the Swiss Social Archives which was in 1906 by Paul Pflüger. At a 1912 party conference in Neuenburg, the question of women's suffrage was debated for the first time. The SP accepted a proposal which committed the party to take any opportunity to "agitate for the introduction of women's suffrage."

Interwar period 
Although Switzerland remained neutral in the First World War, it did not avoid the spiralling economic crisis that accompanied it. The resulting social tension was unleashed in 1918 by the labour unions and the SP who organised the Landesstreik. The goal of the strike was a fundamental reorganisation of society. The Federal Council issued an ultimatum to the strikers and allowed the military occupation of central points. In this way the strike was ended after four days. Political action was quickly taken to conciliate the strikers with the introduction of a 48-hour working week and a popular initiative on proportional elections to the National Council in the 1918 Swiss referendums which passed on 13 October 1918. In the 1919 Swiss federal election, the SP doubled its mandate from 20 to 41 members.

With the third party platform, which was adopted in 1920, disagreement within the party grew ever greater. In particular the fact that the platform called for the foundation of a dictatorship of the proletariat during the transitional phase from a capitalist class-based society to a socialist commune sparked violent dispute within the party. In 1921, the party decided not to join the Communist International. The left-wing of the party then split from the SP and founded the Communist Party of Switzerland. In 1926, the SP joined the Labour and Socialist International and continued to be a member of until 1940.

With increasing power in parliament, the party now also demanded membership of the government, but their candidate in 1929 was not elected to the Federal Council. On the other hand, the party managed to enter the executive at a cantonal level in 1933. Geneva was the first canton to have a socialist government, with Léon Nicole as president. In the fourth party platform, promulgated in 1935, the SP rejected the idea of the dictatorship of the proletariat, but supporting the creation of a socialist society on "free and consensual foundations" remained the party's goal.

In government 

In the 1943 Swiss federal election, the SP achieved the greatest electoral success in its history and became the largest parliamentary group. Ernst Nobs was the first member of SP to be elected to the Federal Council. After the failure of an SP referendum on economic reforms in 1953, the SP member of the Federal Council, Max Weber and the General secretary David Farbstein resigned. The SP remained in opposition until the introduction of the "Magic formula" in 1959, which gave it two seats on the Federal Council. Since that time the SP has been a member of the grand coalition which governs Switzerland. In 1959, the fifth party platform was also agreed in which the party committed itself to reformist socialism on "democratic foundations".

In the 1970s and 1980s, the SP gained new followers from the new social movements that arose from the protests of 1968, but lost part of their traditional voter base in the working class. This change led to fierce internal disputes and led to a decline in electoral success. After serious losses in the 1987 Swiss federal election, the SP was only the third-largest party in the National Council. This resulted in the foundation of a breakaway Democratic-Social Party, which was not a success.

The sixth party platform was promulgated in 1982. This presented the party as a modern people's party that supported democratic socialism and had social justice as its highest goal. In 1983, the SP nominated Lilian Uchtenhagen as their candidate for the Federal Council, the first time that a woman had been a candidate. The parliamentary majority elected Otto Stich instead. Part of the party demanded that the SP withdraw from the governing coalition as a result of this, but this was rejected by a party conference. Ten years later in March 1993, Ruth Dreifuss was elected as the first SD woman to serve in the Federal Council. On that occasion too, the United Federal Assembly did not choose the official candidate of the SP (Christiane Brunner), but the unofficial candidate Dreifuss (the ).

In 1990, the SP party conference accepted Switzerland's accession to the International Monetary Fund with clear conditions and elected the Valais canton councillor, Peter Bodenmann, as party president. At the 1992 party conference in Genf, the SP decided to support accession to the European Economic Area as a first step towards membership of the European Economic Community and endorsed a drug policy involving the decriminalisation of drug consumption, controlled sale of drugs for medicinal purposes, and eventual legalisation of drugs. The following year, the SP supported the national people's initiative "for a reasonable drug policy" which envisioned the legalisation of cannabis. The SP supported the 1994 national initiative "for the protection of the Alps" which sought a substantial shift of transport of goods through the Alps from road to rail. After Otto Stich's resignation from the Federal Council in 1995, the Federal Councillor Moritz Leuenberger was elected as his successor. In the 1995 Swiss federal election, the SP made a substantial recovery and was once again the largest party in the Federal Council.

In June 1997, the party conference chose Zurich city councillor, Ursula Koch as party president (the first woman to hold the role), rather than the favourite . In the 1999 Swiss federal election, Koch was also elected to the Federal Council. She resigned as party president and Federal councillor in 2000, due to internal party pressure. Her successor was Christiane Brunner, who led the party until 2004.

In the 2007 Swiss federal election, the SP suffered massive losses, falling to 19.5% of the vote, with only 43 seats in the National Council. In the following federal elections (2011 and 2015), their electoral support remained at the same level. In the Council of States, where the SP traditionally have had only a few seats, the party was able to increase its representation over the 2000s and now hold 12 out of 46 seats. In 2017, the party withdrew from the Socialist International and joined the Progressive Alliance.

Structure 

The SP is composed of around 900 sections across Switzerland, which exists at cantonal and municipal levels. Each of the 32,000 party members are registered in a local section and thus are members of both the cantonal and national parties. Local sections elect delegates to attend the regular party members' conferences; these delegates are entitled to vote in cantonal party conferences.

Each of the 26 cantonal sections (Valais is divided into two sections, namely Oberwallis and Valais Romand) elect delegates for national party conferences. The number of delegates for each canton is equivalent to the number of seats that the canton has in the National Assembly.

The SP has a youth party called the Young Socialists Switzerland (JUSO/JS). The JS are independent of the SP in political terms but are supported by it financially and institutionally. Within the SP, the JS are seen as equivalent to a cantonal section and so they are entitled to send some delegates to party conferences. As of 2022, the president of the JS is Nicola Siegrist. There is also a separate, smaller SP youth party called Junge SP in the Olten region.

Ideology 

The SP supports classical social-democratic policies, as well as some democratic socialist ones. To that rule, the SP stands for a government offering strong public services. The SP is against far-reaching economic liberalism and is in favor of social progressivism, environmental policy with climate change mitigation, for an open foreign policy and a national security policy based on pacifism.

In economic, financial, and social welfare policy, the SP rejects policies of economic liberalisation such as deregulation, lowering taxes for high-income citizens, and decreases in government spending on social insurance. The SP also opposes raising the retirement age. In addition, the SP is a proponent of increasing welfare spending in some areas such as for a publicly financed maternity leave, universal health care and a flexible retirement age. In tax policy the SP opposes the notion of lowering taxes for high-income citizens. By campaigning for the harmonisation of all tax rates in Switzerland, the SP seeks more redistribution. The SP is skeptical toward the privatization of state enterprises. Nonetheless, the SP also promotes more competition in the areas of agriculture and parallel imports.

In social policy, the SP is committed to social equity and an open society. The SP aims at making working conditions for women in families easier by promoting more external childcare centers and more opportunities for part-time jobs. It also aims at reinforcing sexual equality in terms of eliminating wage differences based on gender, supports civil union for Same-sex couples and takes an easier stance toward abortions. The SP also rejects strengthening restrictions on asylum seekers and immigrants. The party supports the integration of immigrants by which the immigrants are assigned to immigration procedures immediately after entering the country. The SP has a liberal stance toward drugs and is in favor of publicly regulated heroin consumption and the legalization of cannabis. Nevertheless, the SP supports the smoking ban in restaurants and bars.

In foreign policy, the SP promotes further participation by Switzerland in international organizations. It supports immediate entry of Switzerland into the European Union. The SP also stands for a less strict neutrality of Switzerland, and supports increased international efforts on the part of Switzerland in the areas of peace and human rights. However, the SP supports keeping the military neutrality and opposes entry into NATO. Its pacifist stance is also reflected in its military policy as the SP supports reducing the number of Swiss militia while making the military apparatus more professional and scrapping conscription. Another demand of the SP is to end the tradition of gun ownership, using severe and recent examples of abuse in terms of murder as proof.

The SP has common environmentalist policies with the Green Party of Switzerland which are reflected in the expansion of ecotax reforms and increased state support for energy saving measures and renewable energies. The SP is against the construction of new roads where possible and instead proposes to shift the transportation of goods from the roads to the railways and the introduction of a cap and trade and traffic management system when it comes to transportation across the Swiss Alps. Furthermore, the SP stands for an expansion of the public transportation system network and opposes nuclear power.

Electoral performance 

In 2003, the party held 52 mandates out of 200 in the National Council (lower chamber of the Swiss parliament); 9 out of 46 in the Council of States (upper chamber) and 2 out of 7 mandates in the Federal Council (executive body). By 2005, it held 23.8% of the seats in the Cantonal governments and 23.2% in the Cantonal parliaments (index BADAC, weighted with the population and number of seats). At the 2015 Swiss federal election, the party won 18.8% of the popular vote and 43 out of 200 seats in the National Council.

National Council

Party strength over time 

1.* indicates that the party was not on the ballot in this canton.
2.It was part of the Canton of Bern until 1979.

Presidents

Members of the Federal Council

References

External links 
 www.sp-ps.ch Official website in French and German
 www.ps-ticino.ch Official website in Italian
 Social Democratic Party at the History of Social Security in Switzerland

 
Political parties established in 1888
1888 establishments in Switzerland
Full member parties of the Socialist International
Members of the Labour and Socialist International
Non-interventionist parties
Parties related to the Party of European Socialists
Pro-European political parties in Switzerland
Progressive Alliance
Social democratic parties
Socialist parties in Switzerland
Swiss Climate Alliance